Sparrmannia africana, the African hemp or African linden, is a species of flowering plant in the mallow family Malvaceae, native to open woodland in South Africa and Madagascar. It is one of up to seven species in the genus Sparrmannia. The genus name is after Anders Sparrman.

It is not closely related to the true hemp, cannabis.

Sparrmannia species are known for their haptonasty, rapid movements made by the stamens when they are touched. This adaptation helps in more effective pollination.

It has gained the Royal Horticultural Society's Award of Garden Merit. 

The name Sparmannia acerifolia hort. ex Steud., with a mis-spelled generic name – an "orthographic variant" – was in the past used for this species.

See also
List of Southern African indigenous trees

References

External links

 
Sparmannia africana photo

Grewioideae
Flora of Africa
House plants